Šuker is a Croatian surname. It can refer to:

 Davor Šuker (born 1968), retired Croatian footballer
 Ivan Šuker (born 1957), Croatian economist and politician
 Tomislav Šuker (born 1940), Croatian athlete

See also
 Suker Chak, ancestral village of the confederacy of Sukerchakia Misl

Croatian surnames